The Fatboy Slim/Norman Cook Collection is a compilation album by British big beat musician Fatboy Slim, released on Hip-O Records in 2000. It was remixed and produced by Fatboy Slim (Norman Cook).

Track listing 

 Beats International – "Won't Talk About It"
 Pierre Henry – "Psyché Rock (Fatboy Slim Malpaso Mix)"
 Deeds + Thoughts – "The World Is Made Up of This and That (Fatboy Slim Mix)"
 Beats International – "Echo Chamber"
 Beats International – "Dub Be Good to Me"
 Jean-Jacques Perrey – "E.V.A. (Fatboy Slim Remix - Radio Edit)"
 A Tribe Called Quest – "I Left My Wallet in El Segundo (Vampire Mix)"
 Beats International – "The Sun Doesn't Shine"
 Shinehead – "Start an Avalanche"
 Wildchild – "Renegade Master (Fatboy Slim Old Skool Mix)"
 Lunatic Calm – "Roll the Dice (Fatboy Slim Vocal Mix)"
 James Brown – "Payback (The Final Mixdown)"
 Beats International – "Tribute to King Tubby"

Certifications

References

External links 

 
 

Fatboy Slim compilation albums
2000 compilation albums